Barbacoas is a town and municipality in Nariño Department, Colombia.

History 
In the times before the Spanish conquest, Barbacoas was inhabited by the Barbacoa, Telembí and Iscuande tribes. Already in those ages, the town was an important source of gold for the indigenous people.

Modern Barbacoas was founded on April 6, 1600, by Francisco de Praga y Zuniga.

Economy 
Barbacoas is an important mining town in Nariño, producing gold, silver, platinum and coal. Other economical activity is agriculture, with rice, avocadoes, plantains, sugarcane and fruits as bananas and citrus fruits. Other fruits cultivated are ciruelo, guayaba, papaya, pineapples, guanábana, borojó, guayabilla, lulo, anón, guaba, maracuyá, guayaba brasilera, zapallo, coconut, cacao and other agricultural products as arracacha, camote, ñame, achiote, chillangua, tomatoes, peppers, palmito, chillarán, and oregano.

Strike 
The town is infamous for its 2011 "crossed legs" strike, where women in the town foreswore sexual activity pending action on the promised paved road to their town.

Climate
Barbacoas has a tropical rainforest climate (Köppen Af) with very heavy rainfall year-round.

Gallery

Notable people from Barbacoas
 Walden Alexis Vargas, football player
 Déiber Caicedo, football player
 Mateo Cassierra, football player
 Bréiner Castillo, football player
 Carlos Castillo, football player
 Ricardo Coral Dorado, film director.
 Fredy Márquinez, football player
 Rodrigo Sevillano, football player

References

External links 

  
 

Municipalities of Nariño Department
Populated places established in 1600
1600 establishments in the Spanish Empire